Colin Murray Parkes   (born 1928) is a British psychiatrist and the author of numerous books and publications on grief.  He was made an Officer of the Order of the British Empire by Queen Elizabeth II for his services to bereaved people in June 1996.

Career
Since 1966, Parkes has worked at St Christopher's Hospice in Sydenham, where he set up the first hospice-based bereavement service and carried out some of the earliest systematic evaluations of hospice care.

Parkes serves as an honorary consultant psychiatrist to St. Christopher's Hospice in Sydenham.  He was formerly a senior lecturer in psychiatry at the Royal London Hospital Medical College and a member of the research staff at the Tavistock Institute of Human Relations.

Parkes is a former chairman and now life president of the charity Cruse Bereavement Care.  He acted as a consultant and adviser following the Aberfan disaster (October 21, 1966), the air crash of Invicta International Airlines Flight 435 in Switzerland (April 10, 1973), the Bradford Football Club fire (May 11, 1985), the capsize of the MS Herald of Free Enterprise in Belgium (March 6, 1987), and the Pan American Flight 103 explosion over Lockerbie (December 21, 1988).  At the invitation of UNICEF, he acted as consultant in setting up the Trauma Recovery Programme in Rwanda in April 1995. At the invitation of the British government, he helped to set up a programme of support  to assist families from the United Kingdom who were flown out following the terrorist attacks of 11 September, 2001, in New York City.  In April 2005, Parkes was sent by Help the Hospices with Ann Dent to India to assess the psychological needs of people bereaved by the 2004 Indian Ocean earthquake and tsunami.

Writing and editorial career
Parkes worked with Dora Black as a scientific editor of Bereavement Care, the international journal for bereavement counsellors.  He also has served as an advisory editor on several journals concerned with hospice, palliative care, and bereavement, and has edited books on the nature of human attachments, The Place of Attachment in Human Behaviour and Attachment Across the Life Cycle.  More recently he has edited Death and Bereavement Across Cultures and, in 1998, with Andrew Markus, a series of papers which have now been published as a book entitled Coping with Loss.  This last work is intended for members of the health care professions.

Recently Parkes's work has focused on traumatic bereavements (with special reference to violent deaths and the cycle of violence) and on the childhood roots of psychiatric problems that can follow the loss of attachments in adult life.

A quote from his 1972 work Bereavement: Studies of Grief in Adult Life, "The pain of grief is just as much a part of life as the joy of love; it is, perhaps, the price we pay for love, the cost of commitment" was later made famous by Queen Elizabeth II as "Grief is the price we pay for love" in a message of support after the September 11 attacks.

Publications

References

External links 

 

Living people
British psychiatrists
Officers of the Order of the British Empire
1928 births